There have been three business routes of US Highway 41 in the state of Michigan. All of the business routes were former parts of US Highway 41 (US 41). There were:
BUS US 41 in Marquette
BUS US 41 in Negaunee and Ishpeming
BUS US 41 in Baraga

41 Business (Michigan)